Krujë District was one of the 36 districts of Albania, which were dissolved in July 2000 and replaced by 12 counties. It is in the centre of the country, and its capital was the town of Krujë.

Administrative divisions
The district consisted of the following municipalities:

Bubq
Cudhi
Fushë-Krujë
Kodër-Thumanë
Krujë
Nikël

Note: - urban municipalities in bold

References

Districts of Albania
Geography of Durrës County